Severe Exposure is the second album by Six Finger Satellite, released in 1995 through Sub Pop. It was marked by the extensive use of synthesizers, which augmented the jittery, post-punk sound of the band's earlier releases.

A video was released for the single, "Parlour Games".

Production
Severe Exposure was recorded in Six Finger Satellite's studio, The Parlour, in Pawtucket, Rhode Island.

Critical reception
Trouser Press wrote that "'Rabies (Baby’s Got The)' and 'Simian Fever' are animal aggressive and messy, while sharing the synthetic digitone lusts of new wave." The Chicago Tribune wrote that the album "eases up on the electronics but still assembles an arsenal of vintage synthesizers with Nintendo-like sterility." The Washington Post wrote that the band "continues its explorations of the dark post-punk territory blazed by such British outfits as Gang of Four and the Pop Group." SF Weekly wrote: "Call it a party record, the kind you slip on at that inevitable point when you want 'certain people' to head home." CMJ New Music Monthly thought that "the secret is drummer Rick Pelletier, who plays like a death-machine out of control."

Track listing

Personnel 
Six Finger Satellite
James Apt – bass guitar, clarinet
John MacLean – guitar, synthesizer
Richard Ivan Pelletier – drums
Jeremiah Ryan – vocals, Moog synthesizer
Additional musicians and production
Jeff Kleinsmith – design
Charles Peterson – photography
Six Finger Satellite – production

References

External links 
 

Six Finger Satellite albums
1995 albums
Sub Pop albums